Jhanda is a town and Union Council in Swabi District of Khyber-Pakhtunkhwa. It is located at 34°9'0N 72°35'0E with an altitude of 391 metres (1286 feet).
Jhanda is a town in the Swabi District, its history dates back to the early 1800s, its people are commonly from the Yusufzai clan which is from the 1600s. Jhanda is a town which has passed down seven generations. Has green dusty mountains, and agriculture everywhere. 
Its story starts when Maiz Ullah Khan a Pashtun from the Yusufzai clan distributes the land of Swabi amongst his sons, since he had a lot of land to govern (Mardan, Swat and Swabi). His son, Fateh Khan got a large piece of land to rule over, when he was handed the governship of the land, he planted his flag and named the land Jhanda.

References

Populated places in Swabi District
Union Councils of Swabi District